Senator Crist may refer to:

Charlie Crist (born 1956), Florida State Senate
Henry Crist (1764–1844), Kentucky State Senate
Victor Crist (born 1957), Florida State Senate